

This is a list of the National Register of Historic Places listings in Charlevoix County, Michigan.

This is intended to be a complete list of the properties and districts on the National Register of Historic Places in Charlevoix County, Michigan, United States. Latitude and longitude coordinates are provided for many National Register properties and districts; these locations may be seen together in a map.

There are 24 properties and districts listed on the National Register in the county.

Current listings

|}

See also
 
 List of National Historic Landmarks in Michigan
 National Register of Historic Places listings in Michigan
 Listings in neighboring counties: Antrim, Cheboygan, Emmet, Leelanau, Mackinac, Otsego, Schoolcraft
 List of Michigan State Historic Sites in Charlevoix County, Michigan

References

 
Charlevoix County